52 Weeks Make A Year is a 1955 East German drama film directed by Richard Groschopp. It was shot at the Babelsberg Studios in Potsdam.

Plot
In a little Sorbian village in East Germany, old farmer Krestan owns a little land and few animals, which he intends to inherit to his daughter Lena. When the government announces a plan to collectivize all the farms, Krestan is reluctant to hand over his property, and his neighbors share his sentiments. But when they realize the great advantages of collective ownership, they happily join in.

Cast
 Hans Wehrl as Krestan Serbin
 Lotte Loebinger as Serbinowa
 Irene Korb as Lena
 Kurt Oligmüller as Peter
 Erich Franz as Gessner
 Fritz Schlegel as Ladusch
 Lore Frisch as Sonja
 Fabian Wander as Herbert
 Johannes Arpe as Müller
 Dorothea Thiesing as Marta
 Aribert Grimmer as Baumann
 Hans Joachim Schölermann as Professor
 William Gade as Kubank
 Heinz Kammer as Rinke

Production
The film was adapted from Jurij Brězan's novel by the same name, published in 1953. 52 Weeks Make One Year was the first East German film about the collectivization of agriculture in the country.

Reception
The Socialist Unity Party of Germany's magazine, Einheit, dubbed 52 Weeks as one of the films "that were completely supportive of the struggle for German unity and against imperialism and war." Sylvia Klötzer wrote that the film was made in Socialist Realist style. Johannes von Moltke noted that while "suffused with images of rural bliss... rhythms of nature and local tradition" typical to the genre of Homeland films, 52 Weeks "is not entirely irreconcilable with the belief in progress" and is an example to the East German agrarian pictures that focused on the benefits of the collectivization. The Catholic Film Service called it "formalistic, but with good acting."

References

External links

52 Wochen sind ein Jahr original poster on ostfilm.de.

1955 films
DEFA films
1950s German-language films
German black-and-white films
Films directed by Richard Groschopp
East German films
Films shot at Babelsberg Studios
1955 drama films
German drama films
1950s German films